The West Indies cricket team toured England from 19 June to 31 August 2004. The tour began with 3 One-day matches against county teams, followed by the NatWest Series against England and New Zealand. That was followed by 3 first-class matches and 4 Tests.

England won the Test series by 4-0, the first time England has ever won all the Tests in one series against West Indies.

New Zealand won the NatWest Series, beating West Indies by 107 runs in the final.

Test series

1st Test

2nd Test

3rd Test

4th Test

External links
 CricketArchive itinerary
 Cricinfo

References
 Playfair Cricket Annual 
 Wisden Cricketers Almanack (annual)

International cricket competitions in 2004
2004
2004 in English cricket